Streptomyces violaceorectus is a bacterium species from the genus of Streptomyces which has been isolated from soil. Streptomyces violaceorectus produces antimicrobial substances and alkinonase A.

See also 
 List of Streptomyces species

References

Further reading

External links
Type strain of Streptomyces violaceorectus at BacDive -  the Bacterial Diversity Metadatabase

violaceorectus
Bacteria described in 1958